Theodoros Tsoukatos (Leonidio, 1952) is a Greek politician and former MP with PASOK.

He received 1 million Deutschmarks in the context of the Siemens scandal, which he claims he transferred to the party fund of PASOK.

References 

Greek pharmacists
People from Leonidio
1952 births
Living people
Greek MPs 2000–2004
PASOK politicians